Rahmatabad (also Romanized as Raḩmatābād) is a village in Rahmatabad Rural District, Zarqan District, Shiraz County, Fars Province, Iran. At the 2006 census, its population was 3,286, in 850 families.  It is located on the south bank of the Kor river, which feeds lake Bakhtegan. 
The main profession of the residents is farming. Rice, wheat, and corn are primary farming products. Small scale cattle farming is a secondary option for most of the families in this village.

References 

Populated places in Zarqan County